Three Chord Country and American Rock & Roll is the debut studio album of American country music artist Keith Anderson. It features the singles "Pickin' Wildflowers", "XXL", "Every Time I Hear Your Name", and "Podunk", all of which charted in the Top 40 on the Billboard Hot Country Songs charts. A remixed version of the title track, featuring Steven Tyler of the rock band Aerosmith, was to have been released as the album's fourth single (following "Every Time I Hear Your Name"), but this single mix was withdrawn before it could chart, and replaced with "Podunk" as the fourth single. The album has been certified gold in the United States by the RIAA. Jeffrey Steele produced the album except for the title track, which was produced by John Rich of Big & Rich.

Track listing

Chart performance

Weekly charts

Year-end charts

Singles

Certifications

Personnel
Keith Anderson – lead vocals, background vocals, "raving mad girlfriend on cell phone on 'Stick It'"
Brian Barnett – drums
Tom Bukovac – electric guitar
Chad Cromwell – drums
Eric Darken – percussion, lap steel guitar
Tom Hambridge – background vocals
Tony Harrell – piano, Hammond organ, Wurlitzer, synthesizer strings
Bob Hatter – background vocals, talk box guitar
Mike Johnson – pedal steel guitar
Jerry Jones – electric guitar
Steve Mackey – bass guitar
Chip Matthews – background vocals
Vicky McGehee – background vocals
Chris McHugh – drums
Greg Morrow – drums
Danny Myrick – background vocals
Russ Pahl – banjo, "wonk-a-wonk guitar", pedal steel guitar, lap steel guitar, Jew's harp
Ethan Pilzer – bass guitar
Kip Raines – background vocals
Michael Rhodes – bass guitar
John Rich – background vocals
Michael Rojas – piano, Hammond organ, keyboards
Phillip Sanders – acoustic guitar
Adam Shoenfeld – electric guitar
Steven Sheehan – acoustic guitar
Jeffrey Steele – background vocals
3 Ring Circus Singers – background vocals
John Willis – acoustic guitar, electric guitar, National steel guitar 
Jonathan Yudkin – fiddle, percussion, strings

References

2005 debut albums
Keith Anderson albums
Arista Records albums